John Alfred Dowsett  is a former judge of the Federal Court of Australia.

Justice Dowsett was appointed to the Federal Court on 14 September 1998,.  Prior to his appointment to the Federal Court, he served as a judge of the Supreme Court of Queensland from 1985.

Before his appointment to the Supreme Court of Queensland, Justice Dowsett practised as a barrister in Queensland.  He was appointed as a Queen's Counsel in 1982.

Honours
On 11 June 2012, Justice Dowsett was named a Member of the Order of Australia for "service to the law and to the judiciary, to professional associations, and to legal education in the area of litigation and dispute resolution."

See also
List of Judges of the Federal Court of Australia

References

Year of birth missing (living people)
Living people
Judges of the Federal Court of Australia
Judges of the Supreme Court of Queensland
Australian King's Counsel
Members of the Order of Australia
Judges of the Supreme Court of the Australian Capital Territory
20th-century Australian judges
21st-century Australian judges